Min Woo Lee (born 27 July 1998) is an Australian professional golfer who plays on the European Tour. He turned professional at the start of 2019 after a successful amateur career. He won the 2020 ISPS Handa Vic Open and the 2021 Abrdn Scottish Open.

Professional career
Lee turned professional at the start of 2019. He played a number of events on the European Tour and had early success, finishing 4th in the Saudi International and tied for 5th in the ISPS Handa World Super 6 Perth, both events played in February. These were, however, his only top-10 finishes of the season and he finished 117th in the Order of Merit. In October he was tied for 6th in the Genesis Championship on the Korean Tour. At the end of the year he was solo 3rd in the AVJennings NSW Open and then tied for 3rd in the Australian PGA Championship, an early season event on the 2020 European Tour.

In February 2020 he won the ISPS Handa Vic Open, an event co-sanctioned with by the European Tour and the PGA Tour of Australasia.

In July 2021, Lee defeated Thomas Detry and Matt Fitzpatrick in a playoff at the Abrdn Scottish Open. With this win, he earned entry into the 2021 Open Championship.

Personal life
Lee's parents, Soonam and Clara Lee, were both from Korea, and emigrated to Australia in the early 1990s. Lee's older sister, Minjee Lee, is also a professional golfer. When Min Woo Lee won the 2016 U.S. Junior Amateur, they became the first brother/sister pair to win the USGA's junior championships, Minjee Lee having won the U.S. Girls' Junior in 2012.

Amateur wins
2013 Drummond Junior
2014 Drummond Junior
2015 Western Australia Amateur, Drummond Junior, Aaron Baddeley International Junior Championship
2016 U.S. Junior Amateur
2017 Western Australia Amateur
2018 South Australia Amateur Classic

Source:

Professional wins (2)

European Tour wins (2)

1Co-sanctioned by the PGA Tour of Australasia

European Tour playoff record (1–0)

PGA Tour of Australasia wins (1)

1Co-sanctioned by the European Tour

Results in major championships

CUT = missed the half-way cut
"T" = tied

Results in The Players Championship

"T" indicates a tie for a place

Results in World Golf Championships

1Cancelled due to COVID-19 pandemic

"T" = Tied
NT = No tournament
Note that the Championship and Invitational were discontinued from 2022.

Team appearances
Amateur
Nomura Cup (representing Australia): 2017
Bonallack Trophy (representing Asia/Pacific): 2018 (winners)
Eisenhower Trophy (representing Australia): 2018
Sloan Morpeth Trophy (representing Australia): 2016 (winners)

References

External links

Australian male golfers
PGA Tour of Australasia golfers
European Tour golfers
Golfers from Perth, Western Australia
Australian people of Korean descent
1998 births
Living people